Keynote Records was a record label founded by record store owner Eric Bernay in 1940. The label's initial releases were folk and protest songs from the Soviet Union and the Spanish Civil War, and several anti-war releases from American musicians followed. From 1943, the label released recordings in the jazz idiom produced by Harry Lim. The music critic John S. Wilson in 1965 described the company's jazz output as "an unusually valid reflection of the jazz spirits of the times." An unwise investment in a factory to manufacture records in 1947 led to the company becoming bankrupt in 1948, and came under the control of Mercury Records.

The Keynote jazz sessions were comprehensively reissued in 1986 when Nippon Phonogram/PolyGram released a 21 LP set with 115 previously unissued takes. Robert Palmer in The New York Times in October 1986 described it as "a much more substantial addition to the treasury of absolutely essential classic jazz performances than one could have expected or hoped for this late in the game." In 2013, a 11-CD set of Keynote jazz recordings was issued by the Spanish Fresh Sound label. Donald Clarke, writing about Lim's for Keynote, described him as knowing what he was doing and getting "good sound, with no gimmicks."

Roster

The Almanac Singers
George Barnes
Count Basie
Barney Bigard
Marc Blitzstein
Pete Brown
Cozy Cole
Corky Corcoran
Irving Fazola
Roy Eldridge
Bud Freeman
Paul Gonsalves
Johnny Guarnieri
Bill Harris
George Hartman
Ann Hathaway
Coleman Hawkins
Herbie Haymer
J.C. Heard
Neal Hefti
Earl Hines
Milt Hinton
Danny Hurd
Clyde Hurley
Chubby Jackson
Jonah Jones
Kansas City Seven
The Keynoters
Mannie Klein
Bernie Leighton
Al Menconi
Benny Morton
Ted Nash
Red Norvo
Paul Robeson
Earl Robinson
Red Rodney
Harold Rome
Arnold Ross
Babe Russin
Gene Sedric
Charlie Shavers
Willie Smith
Rex Stewart
Billy Taylor
Joe Thomas
Juan Tizol
Lennie Tristano
Dinah Washington
George Wettling
Josh White
Lester Young

References

External links
 The Complete Keynote Collection – 21-LP set issued 1986 (Japan) – Discogs page 
 Discography of Keynote's jazz recordings – Jazz Disco
Keynote Records on the Internet Archive's Great 78 Project
 

Defunct record labels of the United States
Jazz record labels